Gabriel Monsen (15 November 1798 – 1 July 1882) was a Norwegian politician.

He was elected to the Norwegian Parliament in 1842, 1845, and 1848, representing the rural constituency of Stavanger Amt (today named Rogaland); he was also deputy representative in 1851 and 1854. He worked as a farmer.

Monsen hailed from Håland, and was mayor of that municipality in the years 1837-1841, 1846-1849, 1854-1855, and 1860-1879. He often alternated serving in this position with vicar Nils Christopher Bøckmann. Monsen also served as deputy mayor for two years.

References

1798 births
1882 deaths
Members of the Storting
Mayors of places in Rogaland
Politicians from Stavanger